John Adam (born 22 October 1956, in Sydney, New South Wales) is an Australian former professional rugby league footballer who played in the 1970s and 1980s. He played for the North Sydney Bears in the New South Wales Rugby League competition.

Adam showed much promise on the sporting field all through his youth, where he played for and captained the New South Wales under 19's rugby league and cricket sides which forced him to make a decision as to which sport he would continue with past his adolescence. He decided on attempting to forge a career in rugby league and after a brief trial with North Sydney in 1977 he was signed on to a permanent role with the club.

Outside of his sporting exploits Adam was a graduate in law from the University of NSW, skills in which after his retirement still became useful in rugby circles where he became the inaugural president of the players association, which later would become the players union.

Footnotes

External links
John Adam Scoring record

1956 births
Living people
Australian rugby league players
North Sydney Bears players
Rugby league centres
Rugby league players from Sydney
Rugby league wingers